

External links

1957 in United States case law